Valentin Gichev (born 15 January 1961) is a Bulgarian alpine skier. He competed in two events at the 1984 Winter Olympics.

References

1961 births
Living people
Bulgarian male alpine skiers
Olympic alpine skiers of Bulgaria
Alpine skiers at the 1984 Winter Olympics
People from Gabrovo